Fryniwyd Tennyson Jesse Harwood (born Wynifried (Winifred) Margaret Jesse; 1 March 1888 – 6 August 1958)  was an English criminologist, journalist and author (she also wrote as Wynifried Margaret Tennyson).

Early life and marriage
Fryniwyd was the second of three daughters of the Reverend Eustace Tennyson D'Eyncourt Jesse (1853-1928) and Edith Louisa James (1866-1941), and a great-niece of the poet Alfred, Lord Tennyson. Her older sister, Stella Mary Jesse (1887-1942) was also an author, best remembered for her novel Eve in Egypt (1929). Her younger sister, Edith Mary Ermyntrude was born in 1890, but died in infancy. Fryniwyd married Harold Marsh Harwood (1874–1959), a businessman and theatre manager, in September 1918. "Fryn" is a self-made contraction of "Wynifried".

Books
Her most notable books include A Pin to See the Peepshow (London, W. Heinemann Ltd, 1934; Virago Modern Classics; British Library Women Writers), a fictional treatment of the case of Edith Thompson and Frederick Bywaters, and Murder & Its Motives (Heinemann, 1924), which divided killers into six categories based on their motivations: those who murder for Gain, Revenge, Elimination, Jealousy, Conviction and Lust of killing. This classification of motive has remained influential.

She contributed many cases to the Notable British Trials series, such as the trial of serial killer John Christie and the controversy surrounding the hanging of his neighbour, Timothy Evans. Her summary of the two trials is extensive, and concludes that Christie was probably the murderer of both Beryl and Geraldine Evans, and that Timothy Evans was innocent of their deaths (Evans was hanged for the murder of his daughter Geraldine, and posthumously pardoned).

She also wrote the neglected classic, The Lacquer Lady (1929), which recounts the true story of how European maid of honour Fanny Moroni helped bring about the fall of the Burmese Royal Family at the end of the nineteenth century.

She reported on the German attacks on Belgium in the First World War for Collier's Weekly.

Her story Treasure Trove tells of the rediscovery in modern times of the 30 pieces of silver paid to Judas to betray Jesus Christ and their subsequent malign influence. 

The novel Tom Fool (Heinemann, 1926) deals with a young man's experiences on sailing ships, and describes shipboard life in some detail.

The novel Moonraker (Heinemann, 1927) appears to be a typical romantic adventure, but in his 1981 introduction Bob Leeson states that it contains both an embodiment of woman's rebellion and a cry for freedom for black people.

The short story The Mask is collected in Alfred Hitchcock Presents: A Baker's Dozen of Suspense Stories (Dell, 1963).

References

Bibliography
 Joanna Colenbrander, A portrait of Fryn: a biography of F. Tennyson Jesse, A. Deutsch, 1984, .

External links

 Legends of True Crime Reporting: F. Tennyson Jesse
 
 
 
 
 
 

1888 births
1958 deaths
20th-century English women writers
20th-century English writers
British criminologists
British women in World War I
F
British women criminologists